James Farr (born 1979, 42 years old) is a freelance animator and animation director based at present in Tulsa, Oklahoma. He is widely known by the online community for his animated series Xombie and has spawned an illustrated novel, Xombie: Dead on Arrival, and comic book series published by Devil's Due, Xombie: Reanimated. His films are particularly popular on Newgrounds, where they have over 1 billion views.

His portfolio includes work for Epic Level entertainment, New Line Cinema, GeekRescue.com and the Oklahoma City Blazers.

Projects

Xombie 
Xombie tells the story of a little girl named Zoe, who washes ashore years after a zombie plague has wiped out most life on Earth and replaced it with bloodthirsty reanimated versions of the planet's previous inhabitants. She is saved from a swarm of zombies by Dirge, a "variant", a zombie who has retained their conscious mind and the ability to think like a human. (According to the official website, the variants are called "xombies", but the term has yet to be used in the series itself, likely because it is pronounced the same way as "zombie".) Dirge takes it upon himself to perform one last good deed before his zombie body withers away and begins a journey to reunite Zoe with the few remaining live humans and save her from a gruesome death at the hands of the undead.

In 2007, Farr released a book displaying the events of the first saga of the series, entitled Xombie: Dead On Arrival. There is also a six issue comic book series called Xombie: Reanimated, the first issue was released April 2007. A third part of the intended Xombie trilogy, titled Death Warmed Over, was planned but put on indefinite hold due to an unsuccessful Kickstarter campaign.

In March 2017, Farr began a new series on YouTube titled Xombie: Dead Ahead, which is meant to be a continuation of the series, proclaimed as "the next chapter".

Call of the Cryptids 
An animation series in production about the struggles of Kendra Call, a young cryptozoologist, haunted by ghoulish visions of her childhood, desperately searching for proof of monsters unknown to modern science. Upon discovering a note addressed to her and written in riddles, she is flung into a secret war of monsters, to which the rest of the world is seemingly oblivious.

Xombie: Legends of Nephthys 
A prequel to the other Farr flash, Xombie. It will be about the Egyptian xombie Nephthys and the origin of xombies. Currently in development hell.

EV 
A 160-page manga from Tokyopop written by Farr. Released April 2008.

Pac-Man: The Movie 
A live-action short film written and directed by Farr that imagines Pac-Man as a top-secret government project was released in April 2012.

Trainsformers 

A short-lived animated series mashing up Thomas & Friends and Transformers starring Farr's son Vector. This includes a reborn episode released on March 31, 2021.

After the fourth episode, HIT Entertainment (later Mattel Creations, then Fred Rogers Productions) sued Farr for plagiarism due to Thomas having a strict copyright protection. Because of this the first four episodes were pulled from the internet and a fifth was made involving what could have been the fifth episode being halted by the "Fun Police" mid-production causing Vector to go on new adventures around the movie lot.

The series was replaced by The Sky-High City of Steampuff, which also featured trains that can turn into robots and lasted four episodes, with a fifth currently in development.

Before the sixth episode, Farr gets revenge on HIT Entertainment/Mattel Creations from suing him for plagiarism by shutting HIT Entertainment/Mattel Creations down, make the production team of HIT Entertainment/Mattel Creations lose their jobs, and get Thomas out of this production to have strict copyright protection cut off. Despite this the first four episodes were brought back to the internet for fair use or remastered for the 10-year anniversary on April 19, 2019, TRAINS-FORMERS: Gauge of Extinction was made involving for Vector disregarding from going on new adventures around the movie lot and to get revenge to the Fun Police and bring Trainsformers back again.

On December 31, 2018, James Farr fully restored the Trainsformers, but in the Christmas special, generic trains (whose names were Cole, Quazar, Quark and Clunk) were added instead of Thomas characters. This is probably due so HIT Entertainment will not sue James again.

Due to HIT Entertainment's loss of Thomas, Farr properly used Thomas for future videos after getting permission from Mattel or Fred Rogers Productions. As he later on remastered all 4 episodes with the first 2 having different music due to copyright issues and in the last remastered episode Vector sent a message to the viewers saying that if James gets to 500,000 Subscribers, Vector can get Thomas back online.

Blink to the Future 
A mash-up of Doctor Who and Back to the Future, featuring the Eleventh Doctor, his companions Amy Pond and Rory, the Judoon and Cowboy Daleks.

Super Mario Busters 
A mash-up of the Super Mario video game series and the film Ghostbusters.

New Super Mario Busters 2 
A sequel to Super Mario Busters that is a mash-up of the Super Mario video game series and the sequel film Ghostbusters II.

Super Mario Busters: Reboot 
A mash-up of the Super Mario video game series and the reboot film Ghostbusters.

Teenage Mutant Koopa Troopas 
A mash-up of the Super Mario video game series and Teenage Mutant Ninja Turtles, featuring Koopa Troopas as the Turtles, Mario as the Shredder, Princess Daisy as April O'Neill, Mouser as Splinter and Luigi as Casey Jones.

Super Smash Wars 
A mash-up of the Nintendo video game series Super Smash Bros. and Star Wars. There will be nine episodes in total, with the first three being based on the Original Trilogy, the second three being based on the Sequel Trilogy and the remaining three on the Prequel Trilogy.

Released:
 Super Smash Wars: A Link to the Hope
Super Smash Wars: The Empire Smashes Back
Super Smash Wars: Return of the Hero of Time
Super Smash Wars: The Triforce Awakens
Super Smash Wars: The Last Hero

A.V.P.V.T.O.T. (Alien vs. Predator vs Trick-Or-Treating.) 
A parody that features a kid dressed as a Xenomorph from the Alien series battling another kid dressed as a Predator from the Predator series on Halloween.

Wiivengers 
A parody of various Nintendo Wii video games and Avengers Assemble. An adaption of Avengers: Age of Ultron is to follow.

The Big Lebowser 
A mashup of the Paper Mario series RPG games and the movie The Big Lebowski.

Pryamidhead
A parody of the game Cuphead and the Silent Hill series. It features Pyramid Head chasing down Heather Mason in an amusement park level.

Farr later released a sequel titled Pyramid Head 2: Splattered Memories. It features the titular character chasing James Sunderland through the town of Silent Hill. This was released around the time Pyramid Head was announced as a DLC killer in Dead by Daylight.

Jacksepticeye and ZackScottGames Animated 

James Farr has animated many animated videos in conjunction with Jacksepticeye based on his documentation of the following games:
Five Nights at Freddy's
Five Nights at Freddy's 2
Five Nights at Freddy's 3 and Five Nights at Freddy's 4
Super Mario Maker
Five Nights at Freddy's: Sister Location
Sonic Mania
Cuphead
Resident Evil 2 Remake
Farr has also animated many videos in conjunction with ZackScottGames based on his own documentation of the following games:
Dying Light
Wolfenstein: The New Order
Grand Theft Auto V
Sims 4
Mortal Kombat X
Doom (2016)
Splatoon
Minecraft
BioShock
Watch Dogs
Plants vs. Zombies: Garden Warfare 2
Paper Mario: Color Splash
The Legend of Zelda: Breath of the Wild
South Park: The Stick of Truth
Super Mario Odyssey

Interviews
 IGN Comics Interview: When 'Xombies' Attack

References

External links 
JamesFarr.com- Official Site
Xombie
Epic Level Entertainment
Interview with Movie-Club.net
Call of the Cryptids Official Site

Living people
American animators
American animated film directors
Flash artists
American comics writers
Artists from Tulsa, Oklahoma
Writers from Tulsa, Oklahoma
1979 births